Aomi Muyock (born 14 January 1989) is a Swiss actress best known for starring in Gaspar Noé's controversial 2015 film Love.

Biography
Muyock is a Swiss model who made her acting debut in the 2015 3D erotic drama Love. She was born and raised in Canton Ticino and is fluent in Italian. An artist herself, her mother is a painter, photographer, and writer while her father is a sculptor and painter.

Filmography

Film

Television

References

21st-century Swiss actresses
1989 births
Living people